Chandani  is a village development committee in Kanchanpur District in Sudurpashchim Province of south-western Nepal. At the time of the 1991 Nepal census it had a population of 12,385 people living in 2240 individual households. Mainly Brahmins, ksheris mostly western community. The main language is Doteli.

References

Populated places in Kanchanpur District